Ndue Sinishtaj (August 24, 1944) is an Albanian poet, and former Catholic priest from Montenegro known for writing poems in Gheg Albanian.

Early life
Sinishtaj was born in Krševo, an Albanian village in the Gruda region near Podgorica, at the time part of Yugoslavia, but now part of Montenegro. He was given his nickname, Nokë, by his family. He hails from the Shytaj brotherhood, a large family which numbered about 60 members, all living together in a big house known as the tower of Shytaj. He is the fourth of thirteen children in the Sinishtaj family. As pastoralism was the family occupation and means of survival, he was a shepherd as a child.

He attended elementary school in Tuzi taught by teachers who spoke the Gheg dialect. He continued his education in the city of Zadar and finished classic high school in Pazinit. He studied theology at schools in the Balkan cities of Zagreb and Rijeka finally moving to Florence, Italy where he graduated in theology.

Intellectual formation
For Nokë and his family, it was a great honor to be nominated as a Catholic priest and return to Malësia. For five years, Sinishtaj served as a priest in Gusinje, Tuzi, and Hoti. While serving as a priest, he was known for his oratorical skills preaching in church. However, after five years, he left the priesthood to start a family with whom he lives today in Switzerland.

In 2000, many years after leaving the priesthood, he published a book which was both an autobiographical diary and a confessional to justify his decision. The book was entitled Confessions of a Rebellious Priest. In this book Sinishtaj recounts the problems he encountered as a priest. It was because of these events, including hostile behavior, and injustices inside the clergy, that caused him to finally leave the priesthood but not his faith in God.

However he did not stop studying and in 1975 continued his education in Philosophy and Italian Literature at the University of Fribourg, graduating in 1981. He is currently working as a translator at the Court of Lucerne. He is a polyglot, speaking: Albanian, Serbo-Croatian, Latin, German, and Italian.

Works
Works in Albanian :
 Mogilat e Kshevës” (1976) 
 Te varret e Kshevës (At Ksheva graves), poem (1976)
 Syri i ngujuar (Confined eye), poem (1998)
 Në vend të epitafit (Instead of the epitaph), poem (2002)
 I vetmuar, në kopshtin tim, qaj për të afërmit e mi (Alone in my garden, crying over my family), (2002)
 Spirale (Spirals), poem (2003)
 Rekuiem për fshatin tim (Requiem to my village), poem (2005)
 Tetë letra të Martin Camajt (Eight letters of Martin Camaj), (2000)
 Nga sergjeni i harruar (From the forgotten shelf), poem (2007)
 Rrefimet e një prifti të rebeluar (Tales of a rebelled priest), (2000)
 Kupa e thyer e heshtjes (The broken glass of silence), poem (2010)
 Nën arkada të universit (Under the arcade of the universe), poem (2013)

Works in Croatian :
 More mira u nemiru (The sea of quitenes in unquietitude ), poem (1974)
 Nerastočeni mir (Nerastoceni peace), poem (1974)
 Dubrovnik (Dubrovnik), poem (1974)
 Apokalipsa Paška s Prokletia (Apocalypse of Paško from Prokletia), novel (1977)

Works in Italian
 Rimani amica (Stay friend), poem (1977)

Work in German
 Eingewickelt in sein Schweisstuch (Wrapped in his sweat cloth), poem (1994)

References

1944 births
Living people
20th-century Albanian Roman Catholic priests
Albanian male poets
Albanian expatriates in Switzerland
Albanians in Montenegro
20th-century Albanian poets
21st-century Albanian poets
Malsorë
Montenegrin expatriates in Switzerland
Writers from Podgorica
Albanian-language poets
German-language poets
Croatian-language poets
Italian-language poets
Croatian-language writers
20th-century Montenegrin people
21st-century Montenegrin people
Albanian novelists
Male novelists
20th-century novelists
21st-century novelists
Montenegrin poets
Montenegrin male writers
Montenegrin novelists
20th-century male writers
21st-century male writers